The 2015 MAAC Men's Lacrosse Championship took place from April 30 to May 2 that year at Tenney Stadium in Poughkeepsie, New York, United States. The winner of the tournament received the Metro Atlantic Athletic Conference's automatic bid to the 2015 NCAA Division I Men's Lacrosse Championship. Four teams from the MAAC conference will compete in the single elimination tournament. The seeds were based upon the teams' regular season conference record.

Standings
Only the top four teams in the Metro Atlantic Athletic conference advanced to the MAAC Conference Tournament.

Schedule

Bracket
Tenney Stadium - Poughkeepsie, New York

 denotes an overtime game

All-Tournament
Shayne Adams, Detroit

Brandon Beauregard, Detroit

John Castellano, Monmouth

Ryan Horsch, Monmouth

Jack Brust, Quinnipiac

Mike Sagl, Quinnipiac

Mike Begley, Marist

Karl Kreshpane, Marist

Joseph Radin, Marist

Most Outstanding Player
Dave Scarcello, Marist

References

http://www.maacsports.com/ViewArticle.dbml?&DB_OEM_ID=17400&ATCLID=210066509 Retrieved 2015-05-15.

External links

MAAC Tournament
MAAC Men's Lacrosse
Metro Atlantic Athletic Conference men's lacrosse